Yule Peak is a small but conspicuous triangular rock peak (750 m) at west end of Bermel Peninsula, Bowman Coast on the east coast of the Antarctic Peninsula. The peak was photographed from the air by Lincoln Ellsworth on November 21 and 23, 1935, and was mapped from these photos by W.L.G. Joerg. Surveyed by Falkland Islands Dependencies Survey (FIDS) in December 1958 and so named because Christmas Day 1958 was celebrated by the FIDS sledging party close to this peak.

Mountains of Graham Land
Bowman Coast